Harun Isa (Macedonian: Харун Иса; born 21 June 1969) is a Yugoslav former professional footballer who played as a striker.

Club career 
Born in Tetovo, SR Macedonia, SFR Yugoslavia, Harun Isa started his senior career in 1988, when he started playing in the Second Yugoslav League club Liria Prizren where he won a place in the first team and started having some great exhibitions, crowned with nine goals. This earned him a trip to the Yugoslav capital Belgrade where, in January 1990, he started to play for the Yugoslav First League club Rad Beograd. Having failed to impress there due to the heavy competition in the squad, in January 1991, he moved to the ambitious Second League club FK Priština, the most successful Kosovar club and nowadays called by its Albanian language form KF Prishtina.

After the breakup of SFR Yugoslavia, Isa went to Germany where he first played for Hertha Zehlendorf, and in 1994 signed for the famous Bundesliga club Hertha BSC. After one season, he left for another Berlin club Tennis Borussia Berlin where he consolidated a place in the team and stayed with the club four seasons. In 1999, he signed for FC Erzgebirge Aue but, after one season, returned to the German capital, this time to play for 1. FC Union Berlin. In summer of 2002 aged 33 years, Harun moved to VfL Osnabrück where he played two seasons before retiring in 2004.

References

External links
 
 Stats from Yugoslav leagues at Zerodic
 Harun Isa at immerunioner.de
 

1969 births
Living people
Sportspeople from Tetovo
Albanians in North Macedonia
Association football forwards
Yugoslav footballers
Macedonian footballers
KF Liria players
FK Rad players
FC Prishtina players
Hertha Zehlendorf players
Hertha BSC players
Tennis Borussia Berlin players
FC Erzgebirge Aue players
1. FC Union Berlin players
VfL Osnabrück players
Yugoslav First League players
Yugoslav Second League players
2. Bundesliga players
Macedonian expatriate footballers
Macedonian expatriate sportspeople in Serbia and Montenegro
Expatriate footballers in Serbia and Montenegro
Macedonian expatriate sportspeople in Germany
Expatriate footballers in Germany